The Ghana Chamber of Mines main minerals industry association in Ghana. The Chamber is the umbrella body that represents the shared interests of companies involved in mineral exploration, production and processing in the country. It was founded in 1928 and has its members accounting for over 90 percent of all of the country's mineral production.

References

Mining in Ghana